Khamal may refer to:
 Mohamed Khamal (born 1990), Moroccan-Dutch kickboxer
 Kamahl (born 1934), Australian singer

See also 
 Kamal (disambiguation)
 Hamal (disambiguation)